|}

The Lyric  Stakes is a Listed flat horse race in Great Britain open to mares and fillies aged three years or older.
It is run at York over a distance of 1 mile 2 furlongs and 56 yards (2,063 metres), and it is scheduled to take place each year in July.

The race was first run in 2008.

Records
Most successful horse:
 no horse has won this race more than once

Leading jockey (2 wins):
 Frankie Dettori – Sajjhaa (2011), Franconia (2020)
Kieren Fallon – Hippy Hippy Shake (2013), Tasaday (2014)

Leading trainer (3 wins):
John Gosden – French Dressing (2015), Fanny Logan (2019), Franconia (2020)
 Sir Michael Stoute – Nouriya (2010), Diploma (2016), Desert Diamond (2018)

Winners

See also
 Horse racing in Great Britain
 List of British flat horse races

References
Racing Post:

Flat races in Great Britain
York Racecourse
Middle distance horse races for fillies and mares
Recurring sporting events established in 2008